Trimethylsilyldiazomethane is the organosilicon compound with the formula (CH3)3SiCHN2.  It is classified as a diazo compound.  Trimethylsilyldiazomethane is a commercially available reagent used in organic chemistry as a methylating agent and as a source of CH2 group.  Its behavior is akin to the less convenient reagent diazomethane.

Preparation
Trimethylsilyldiazomethane can be prepared by treating (trimethylsilyl)methylmagnesium chloride with diphenyl phosphorazidate.  The 13C-labeled reagent is also known.

Uses
It is a less explosive alternative to diazomethane for the methylation of carboxylic acids. It also reacts with alcohols to give methyl ethers, where diazomethane may not.

It has also been employed widely in tandem with GC-MS for the analysis of various carboxylic compounds which are ubiquitous in nature. The fact that the reaction is rapid and occurs readily makes it attractive.  However, it can form artifacts which complicate spectral interpretation. Such artifacts are usually the trimethylsilylmethyl esters, RCO2CH2SiMe3, formed when insufficient methanol is present. Acid-catalysed methanolysis is necessary to achieve near-quantitative yields of the desired methyl esters, RCO2Me.

The compound is a reagent in the Doyle-Kirmse reaction with allyl sulfides and allyl amines.

Trimethylsilyldiazomethyllithium
Trimethylsilyldiazomethane is deprotonated by butyllithium:
(CH3)3SiCHN2  +  BuLi   →   (CH3)3SiCLiN2  +  BuH
The lithio compound is versatile. From it can be prepared other trimethylsilyldiazoalkanes:
(CH3)3SiCLiN2  +  RX   →   (CH3)3SiCRN2  +  LiX
(CH3)3SiCLiN2 reacts with ketones and aldehydes to give, depending on the substituents, acetylenes.

Safety
Trimethylsilyldiazomethane is highly toxic.  It has been implicated in the death of at least two chemists, a pharmaceutical worker in Windsor, Nova Scotia, Canada and one in New Jersey. Inhalation of diazomethane is known to cause pulmonary edema; trimethylsilyldiazomethane is suspected to behave similarly.

When used as a reagent in organic synthesis to convert carboxylic acids to their methyl esters, trimethylsilyldiazomethane undergoes acid-catalysed methanolysis, forming diazomethane in situ. A similar hydrolysis reaction may take place when trimethylsilyldiazomethane comes into contact with water on the surface of a human lung.

Trimethylsilyldiazomethane is nonexplosive.

References

Diazo compounds
Reagents for organic chemistry
Carbosilanes
Methylating agents
Trimethylsilyl compounds